Hans Jüttner (2 March 1894 – 24 May 1965) was a German high-ranking functionary in the SS of Nazi Germany who served as the head of the SS Führungshauptamt (SS Leadership Main Office).

Career in the Nazi Party and the SS
In 1933 Jüttner joined the SA. In 1934, Jüttner became chef of the SA Reichsführerschule (training body for SA leaders) in Munich.  In May 1935, he switched to the SS combat support force (SS-Verfügungstruppe or SS-VT), which subsequently became the Waffen-SS. By 1939, Jüttner had become the Inspector of Reserve Troops of the SS-VT-Division. From early 1940, Jüttner led the SS-VT command office.

In the summer of the same year, Jüttner was promoted to chief of staff of the newly created SS Leadership Main Office (SS-Führungshauptamt), which was responsible for the Waffen-SS's organizational and administrative leadership. This was separate from the administration of Nazi concentration camps,  the SS Economic and Administrative Main Office (SS-Wirtschafts-Verwaltungshauptamt), and from the Reich Security Main Office, which administered the Gestapo, Kripo and SD. Shortly after taking office, Jüttner was instrumental in wresting control of the militarized Death's Head regiments (Totenkopfstandarten) from Concentration Camps Inspectorate chief Theodor Eicke and amalgamating them into the Waffen-SS. In June 1943, he was promoted to SS-Obergruppenführer. On 30 January 1943, Jüttner became chief of the SS Leadership Main Office. On 21 July, 1944, after Heinrich Himmler had been placed in charge of the Replacement Army following the failed coup on  20 July 1944, Himmler appointed Jüttner Chief of "Army Armament and Commander of the Reserve Army". Jüttner was later awarded the Knights Cross of the War Merit Cross, with Swords.

Trial and conviction
On 17 May 1945, Jüttner was taken prisoner by British forces.  In 1948 he was sentenced to 10 years  in a labour camp. In appeal proceedings in 1949 the punishment was lowered to 4 years.  In 1961 Jüttner testified for the prosecution in the trial of Holocaust architect Adolf Eichmann. Later Jüttner was the proprietor of a sanatorium in Bad Tölz, where he died in 1965.

References

External link

1894 births
1965 deaths
People from the Province of Posen
Nazi Party politicians
Holocaust perpetrators in Russia
SS-Obergruppenführer
Academic staff of the University of Breslau
Nazis convicted of war crimes
Recipients of the Knights Cross of the War Merit Cross
Waffen-SS personnel
20th-century Freikorps personnel